Stary Jamielnik  is a village in the administrative district of Gmina Stoczek Łukowski, within Łuków County, Lublin Voivodeship, in eastern Poland.

References

Stary Jamielnik